Tiger Eyes is the debut extended play (EP) by South Korean singer Ryu Su-jeong. The EP was released on May 20, 2020 by Woollim Entertainment and distributed by Kakao M. The album contains seven tracks, including the lead single "Tiger Eyes".

Background and release

Ryu Su-jeong debuted in a girlgroup Lovelyz on November, 2014. On May 6, 2020, Woollim Entertainment announced Ryu Su-jeong would make her solo debut on mid May following her fellow member Kei who debuted as a solo singer on 2019. The next day the release date was revealed to be on May 28, 2020 along with the album title "Tiger Eyes". On May 11, the voice teaser for title track "Tiger Eyes" was released. A scheduler for "Tiger Eyes" was released on May 12 followed by series of teasers along with track videos.  On May 16 the highlight medley released through Lovelyz official SNS. The 30 seconds music video teaser was released on May 18. The album was released on May 20 along with the music video for "Tiger Eyes".

Track listing

Charts

References

2020 debut EPs
Woollim Entertainment EPs
Korean-language EPs
Kakao M EPs